Carlos Felipe Rodríguez Rangel (born 3 April 1989) is a Mexican professional footballer who plays as a goalkeeper for Liga MX club Juárez.

Club career
Rodríguez played for Mérida in the Mexican Primera División A during 2008.

Personal life
Rodríguez is the cousin of former professional goalkeeper Moisés Muñoz.

Honours
Morelia
Copa MX: Apertura 2013
Supercopa MX: 2014

References

External links
 
 

1989 births
Living people
Liga MX players
Atlético Morelia players
2011 Copa América players
Association football goalkeepers
Sportspeople from Morelia
Footballers from Michoacán
Mexican footballers
C.F. Mérida footballers